The 1943 Darwen by-election was a by-election held on 15 December 1943 for the British House of Commons constituency of Darwen in Lancashire.

Vacancy
The seat had become vacant after the death in October of the Conservative Member of Parliament (MP) Stuart Russell, who had been killed in World War II. He had been elected at the 1935 general election, beating the Liberal Party leader Sir Herbert Samuel.

Election history
In the 1935 general election, the Conservatives had won 41% of the votes, with a narrow majority over the outgoing Liberal MP.
The result at the last General election was

Candidates
The Conservatives chose Stanley Prescott to defend the seat. 
The Liberal Party prospective candidate was Philip Rea, who had been in place since 1939. However, the local Liberal Association decided not to contest the by-election. During World War II, the major parties had agreed an electoral pact under which they would not contest by-elections in seats held by their respective parties, and as a result many wartime by-elections resulting in a candidate being returned unopposed. However, other parties and independent politicians were free to field candidates, and, at Darwen, Honor Balfour stood as an "Independent Liberal". She was a university graduate, working as a journalist in London, and was a member of the Liberal Party National Executive. She was a known opponent of the electoral truce, and was prominent in the Liberal Action Group. She had spoken in support of the Independent Liberal candidate Donald Johnson at the 1943 Chippenham by-election. She resigned her Liberal Party membership in order to contest the election. 
The prospective Labour Party candidate, Ronald Haines, who had been in place since 1939 chose not to stand.

Campaign
Balfour was encouraged to stand by the Liberal Party 'Radical Action' group that believed in contesting by-elections and had achieved a good result at the 1943 Chippenham by-election. There was some concern in the Liberal Party that the leadership would want to continue in an all-party Coalition Government after the war was over. However, the group was small and was unable to influence many party workers to give their support to her campaign. The executive of the Darwen Liberal Association decided to give her strong support to Honor Balfour's Independent Liberal candidature. However the President of the Association, Sir Frederick Hindle who had been the Liberal MP for the constituency in the 1920s, was one of the people who signed Russell's nomination papers. Finding himself at odds with his association, Hindle stood down as president. The decision of the Darwen Liberals didn't extend to providing Balfour with an election agent she had to call upon a personal friend Mrs Ivor Davies to act as agent. Liberal Leader, Sir Archibald Sinclair, in accordance with the wartime electoral truce, signed a public letter of support for Russell. Balfour's campaign did receive some backing from Richard Acland's Common Wealth organisation. Balfour was backed by the News Chronicle, but only after the local newspapers had threatened to boycott her campaign altogether.

Result 
Prescott increased the Conservative share of the vote, albeit on a much-reduced turnout. However, Balfour came within 70 votes of winning the seat.

Aftermath
Balfour published an article Why I Challenge the Electoral Truce in the magazine Liberal Forward which encouraged a large number of Liberal members to give their active support to the 'Independent' Liberal candidate at the 1944 Bury St Edmunds by-election.
Balfour contested the 1945 election here as the official Liberal candidate, thereafter she did not stand again. Prescott held the seat until retiring in 1951.
The result at the following General election;

See also
 Darwen constituency
 List of United Kingdom by-elections

References 
 Who's Who: www.ukwhoswho.com

Bibliography
 Liberal Crusader by Gerard De Groot
 Trial By Ballot by Ivor RM Davies
 By-Elections in British Politics by Cook and Ramsden
 
 

1943 elections in the United Kingdom
1943 in England
1940s in Lancashire
Politics of Blackburn with Darwen
By-elections to the Parliament of the United Kingdom in Lancashire constituencies